Janice Murray may refer to:
Janice Murray (footballer) (born 1966), English football player
Janice Murray (speech therapist), speech therapist and professor